Song of the Miraculous Hind is a 2002 Hungarian animated mythological and historical film directed by Marcell Jankovics. It tells the story of the Hungarian people, from the creation of the first humans to the time of Prince Géza, when the nation was Christianized. The narrative is told in five sections, each focusing on a different era. The film was produced by Pannonia Film Studio. It was released on Hungarian cinemas on 21 February 2002.

Reception
David Stratton wrote in Variety: "An animated history lesson for Hungarian schoolkids, Song of the Miraculous Hind has little or nothing to offer non-Magyars. Long-in-production feature from veteran Marcell Jankovics offers good, if very retro, design, and bright use of color, but little in the way of contemporary animation techniques. ... Using a mainly choral soundtrack, pic takes itself very seriously, with no attempts at humor as the lengthy saga unfolds."

References

2000s historical films
2002 animated films
2002 films
Films based on Finno-Ugric mythology
Films directed by Marcell Jankovics
Hungarian animated films
Hungarian historical films
Hungarian mythology
2000s Hungarian-language films
Religious epic films